Lieutenant General Hein du Toit  (born 1926) 
was a former South African Army officer, who served as Chief of Staff Intelligence.

Army career
He joined the UDF in 1953. By 1964 he was a staff officer in Directorate of Military Intelligence (DMI). He was appointed its deputy director in 1966. On 19 July 1971 he became the Director of the DMI, a position he held until 30 April 1974. The Directors position was renamed as the Chief of Staff Intelligence on the 1 May 1974 and he held it until 31 December 1977. He was also known as a historian, a former state archivist, heraldist and earned a LLB degree. After retirement from the SADF he served on the Heraldry Council of South Africa until 1995. He was also a professor of Strategic Studies at Rand Afrikaans University (RAU) in his retirement.

Awards and decorations

References

South African generals
1926 births
Possibly living people